Doin' Our Thing is the sixth studio album by R&B band Booker T. & the M.G.'s, released in April 1968. The album was their first self-produced effort and charted at number 176 on the Billboard Top 200 Chart.

Track listing
Side 1
"I Can Dig It" (Cropper, Dunn, Jones, Jackson) – 2:42 
"Expressway (to Your Heart)" (Kenny Gamble, Leon Huff) – 3:05 
"Doin' Our Thing" (Cropper, Dunn, Jones, Jackson) – 4:01 
"You Don't Love Me" (Willie Cobbs) – 2:49
"Never My Love" (Don Addrisi) – 2:47
"The Exodus Song" (Ernest Gold) – 2:38
Side 2
"The Beat Goes On" (Sonny Bono) – 2:39
"Ode to Billie Joe" (Bobbie Gentry) – 4:02
"Blue on Green" (Cropper, Dunn, Jones, Jackson) – 2:28
"You Keep Me Hanging On" (Lamont Dozier, Eddie Holland, Brian Holland) – 4:50
"Let's Go Get Stoned" (Nickolas Ashford, Valerie Simpson, Josephine Armstead) – 2:54

Personnel 
Booker T. & the M.G.s
Booker T. Jones – Hammond organ, guitar, clavinet, piano
Steve Cropper – guitar
Donald Dunn – bass guitar
Al Jackson Jr. – drums, percussion

Technical
Loring Eutemey – design
Dan Hersch – digital remastering
Peter Hujar – photography
Bill Inglot – digital remastering
Peter Jujar – photography
Bill Kington – photography
The M.G.'s – supervision (producer)

References

Booker T. & the M.G.'s albums
1968 albums
Stax Records albums
Atlantic Records albums
Albums produced by Steve Cropper
Albums produced by Donald "Duck" Dunn
Albums produced by Al Jackson Jr.
Albums produced by Booker T. Jones